Sancos District is one of four districts of the Huanca Sancos Province in Peru.

Geography 
Other mountains are listed below:

Ethnic groups 
The people in the district are mainly indigenous citizens of Quechua descent. Quechua is the language which the majority of the population (60.61%) learnt to speak in childhood, 38.51% of the residents started speaking using the Spanish language (2007 Peru Census).

References